Gita, or Geeta is an Indian feminine given name.

List of people with the given name 
Geeta Anand, journalist and author who writes for the Wall Street Journal
Geeta Bali (1930–1965), Bollywood actress      
Geeta Basra, Bollywood actress       
Gita Bhartiji         
Geeta Chopra, involved in the Geeta and Sanjay Chopra kidnapping case
Geeta Citygirl, actor, dancer, director, producer     
Gita Dey         
Gita Dodova         
Geeta Dutt, Indian singer       
Gita Ghatak         
Gita Gopinath         
Gita Gutawa         
Geeta Iyengar, Yoga teacher       
Gita Johar         
Geeta Kapoor, Bollywood choreographer       
Gita Kapoor, a fictional character in the soap opera EastEnders 
Geeta Kapur (born 1943), Indian art critic and curator  
Gita Mehta (born 1943), Indian writer     
Geeta Nargund, medical director       
Geeta Novotny, American mezzo-soprano, actor, writer and columnist   
Geeta Phogat, wrestler        
Gita Piramal         
Geeta Rani, Indian weightlifter       
Geeta Rao Gupta, AIDS and feminist activist   
J. Geeta Reddy, Indian politician
Gita Sahgal         
Geeta Sane, feminist writer       
Gita Siddharth         
Geeta Vadhera, artist        
Gita Wirjawan         
Geeta Zutshi, Indian athlete

See also
Gita (disambiguation)

References

Indian feminine given names